Leucanthemum vulgare, commonly known as the ox-eye daisy, oxeye daisy, dog daisy, marguerite ("common marguerite") and other common names, is a widespread flowering plant native to Europe and the temperate regions of Asia, and an introduced plant to North America, Australia and New Zealand.

Description
The lower parts of the stem are hairy, sometimes densely hairy but more or less glabrous in the upper parts. These leaves have up to 15 teeth, or lobes or both on the edges.

The plant bears up to three "flowers" like those of a typical daisy. Flowering occurs from May to October.

Ox-eye daisy is similar to shasta daisy (Leucanthemum × superbum) which has larger flower heads ( wide) and to stinking chamomile (Anthemis cotula) which has smaller heads ( wide). L. maximum is also similar, usually with rays  in length.

Taxonomy
L. vulgare was first formally described in 1778 by Jean-Baptiste Lamarck, who published the description in Flore françoise. It is also known by the common names ox-eye daisy, dog daisy, field daisy, Marguerite, moon daisy, moon-penny, poor-land penny, poverty daisy and white daisy.

The species was formerly described as part of the Chrysanthemum genus.

Distribution and habitat
The species is native to Europe, and to Turkey and Georgia in Western Asia. It is a typical grassland perennial wildflower, growing in a variety of plant communities including meadows and fields, under scrub and open-canopy forests, and in disturbed areas. The species is widely naturalised in many parts of the world, including North America, and is considered to be an invasive species in more than forty countries. It grows in temperate regions where average annual rainfall exceeds , and often where soils are heavy and damp. It is often a weed of degraded pastures and roadsides.

Ecology
The species spreads by seeds and by shallow, creeping rhizomes. A mature plant can produce up to 26,000 seeds that are spread by animals, vehicles, water and contaminated agricultural produce, and some seeds remain viable for up to nearly forty years. It is not palatable to cattle and reduces the amount of quality pasture available for grazing. In native landscapes such as the Kosciuszko National Park in Australia, dense infestation can exclude native plants, causing soil erosion and loss of soil organic matter.

This plant was top-ranked for pollen production per floral unit sampled at the level of the entire capitulum, with a value of 15.9 ± 2 μL, in a UK study of meadow flowers.

As an invasive species

L. vulgare is one of the most widespread weeds in the Anthemideae. It became an introduced species via gardens into natural areas in parts of Canada, the United States, Australia, and New Zealand. In some habitats it forms dense colonies displacing native plants and modifying existing communities.

The plant commonly invades lawns, and is difficult to control or eradicate, since a new plant can regenerate from rhizome fragments and is a problem in pastures where beef and dairy cattle graze, as usually they will not eat it, thus enabling it to spread; cows who do eat it produce milk with an undesirable flavor. It has been shown to carry several crop diseases.

This species has been declared an environmental weed in New South Wales and Victoria. In New South Wales it grows from Glen Innes on the Northern Tablelands to Bombala in the far southeast of the state, and there are significant populations in the Kosciuszko National Park where it has invaded subalpine grassland, snowgum (Eucalyptus pauciflora) woodland and wetlands. In Victoria it is a prohibited species and must be eradicated or controlled.

Uses

Food
The unopened flower buds can be marinated and used in a similar way to capers.

Maud Grieve's Modern Herbal (1931) states that "The taste of the dried herb is bitter and tingling, and the odour faintly resembles that of valerian."

Tea
Oxeye grows wild in the Arava Desert in Southern Israel, where the flowers are picked and dried and traditionally used by Jewish Israelis to make a local variety of herbal tea.

Use in horticulture
L. vulgare is widely cultivated and available as a perennial flowering ornamental plant for gardens and designed meadow landscapes. It thrives in a wide range of conditions but prefers a sunny or part-sun location of average soil that is damp (like many in the daisy family). The plant does well in raised and mulched garden beds that retain moisture and prevent weeds. It is a mesophyte and therefore requires more or less a continuous water supply.  The heads of faded and old blooms are often deadheaded to promote further blooming and to maintain the appearance of the plant. There are cultivars, such as 'May Queen', that begin blooming in early spring.

Allergies
Allergies to daisies do occur, usually causing contact dermatitis.

See also
Bellis perennis – common daisy 
Buphthalmum salicifolium – yellow ox-eye daisy
Argyranthemum frutescens – marguerite daisy

References

Further reading

External links 

USDA Plants Profile: Leucanthemum vulgare (oxeye daisy)
Leucanthemum vulgare (oxe-eye daisy) – U.C. Cal.Photo gallery
Cirrus: Leucanthemum vulgare photographs and information

vulgare
Flora of Europe
Flora of Central Asia
Inflorescence vegetables
Garden plants of Asia
Garden plants of Europe
Plants described in 1753
Taxa named by Carl Linnaeus
Taxa named by Jean-Baptiste Lamarck